Kateretes rufilabris is a species of short-winged flower beetles native to Europe.

References

Kateretidae
Beetles described in 1807
Beetles of Europe